Victoria Falls University of Technology is a private University located in Livingstone, Zambia.

References

External links
 

Victoria Falls University of Technology